Carlos Ruiz Chapellín (Caracas, 1865—August 1912) was a Venezuelan showman, filmmaker and performer. He is remembered for creating slapstick comedy films in the late 19th century.

Theatre producer and showman
Ruiz's first business was in putting on popular shows, a pursuit he never gave up through his filmmaking efforts.

Filmmaking
In 1897, shortly after it opened, Ruiz rented the Circo Metropolitano, where he would show zarzuelas and circus variety shows. He also planned to go into the film business after the release of the first Venezuelan films in Maracaibo in January 1897, forming a partnership with Ricardo Rouffet to create their own films. He also hired a man, W. O. Wolcopt from the United States, as part of this venture. Ruiz and Wolcopt may have shown a film called Disputa entre Andracistas y Rojistas, which showed a fight between supporters of that year's political candidates Ignacio Andrade and Juan Pablo Rojas Paúl; the nature of the film suggests a Venezuelan author, but there are few records of it. After the show Wolcopt traveled the country for four months with the Projectoscope before returning to Caracas.

Ruiz then hired Gabriel Veyre to show his Cinematograph at the Circo after seeing him project another film at the Fortuna Hall in Caracas. Ruiz and Veyre had a dispute, with Ruiz claiming Veyre was in breach of contract and sent a letter saying so to Veyre's mother; Veyre fled the country to Colombia, but his Cinematograph, which could both record and project film, may have been used to make Ruiz's films. Azuaga García describes Ruiz's choice to hold film showings in a circus as "gaudy", as the previous screenings were held in spectacular theatres and halls, but also suggests it was Ruiz's attempt to "truly bring cinema to the popular classes".

Elisa Martínez de Badra reviews the cinema of early Venezuela shortly by suggesting that the partnership of Ruiz and Wolcopt, along with the first Venezuelan films shown in January 1897, can be considered early examples of attempts at narrative cinema.

He briefly returned to films in 1899, before going back to his production business.

Later life
Ruiz became a devoted writer in his later life. He died in August 1912, and is interred at the Cementerio General del Sur in Caracas.

References

Sources
Literature

Web

1865 births
1912 deaths
Venezuelan actors